The 2018 ITU World Triathlon Series was the 10th season of the World Triathlon Series, the top-level international series for triathlon, since its establishment in 2009. The season consisted of nine pairs of triathlon races for both a men's and women's competition, as well as three mixed relays, beginning on 2 March in Abu Dhabi, and concluding on 16 September with the grand final at the Gold Coast. 

Mario Mola and Flora Duffy began the season as defending champions from the 2017 season. Mola would go on to defend his title and win the men's series for the third time in as many years, becoming the second-most successful triathlete at the world triathlon series after fellow countryman Javier Gómez. 

Duffy's season however would be plagued by injuries, leading to an inability to defend her title despite winning two races early in the season. The eventual winner, Vicky Holland, captured the women's series by moving into first place only after the final race of the series. The most notable event of the year was in Bermuda where the Norwegian team completed the first men's podium sweep, with race winner Casper Stornes having only competed in two prior WTS races.

Overview

Calendar 
The 2018 ITU World Triathlon Series visited nine cities, and incorporated the three events of the inaugural Mixed Relay Series in Nottingham, Edmonton, and the Mixed Relay world championship in Hamburg.

Point System 
For every race a triathlete finished, they received points based on their position across the line. For a normal world series event, first place was awarded 1,000 points and every subsequent place was awarded 7.5% less, for the first forty triathletes; for the grand final, 1,200 points were awarded, once again decreasing by 7.5% for each place, but this time awarded down to 50th. However, if a triathlete finished outside the time cut (more than 5% longer than the winner's time for men, 8% for women), they received no points even if they finished in a scoring position. A triathlete's final score was the sum of their points from the grand final and their best five race scores of that year.

Results

Medal summary

Men

Women

Mixed relay

Overall standings
The athlete who accumulates the most points throughout the season is declared the year's world champion. The final point standings are:

Men

Women

References

External links

Official website

World Triathlon Series
ITU World Triathlon Series